Gang Gajang is the self-titled debut album from Gang Gajang.  It was released on True Tone Records through Polygram Records in 1985 and sold over 120,000 copies. It was produced by Joe Wissert, with band members Graham 'Buzz' Bidstrup and Mark Callaghan.

Track listing 

All songs written by Mark Callaghan unless otherwise indicated.
 "Gimme Some Lovin" (Callaghan, Graham Bidstrup) - 2:43
 "Sounds of Then (This is Australia)" - 3:53
 "Distraction" - 3:21
 "Maybe I" (Bidstrup, Callaghan) - 3:35
 "Ambulance Men" - 3:24
 "The Bigger They Are" - 3:29
 "Giver of Life" (Geoffrey Stapleton, Chris Bailey, Callaghan, Bidstrup, Kayellen Bidstrup aka Kay Bee) - 3:38
 "Shadow of Your Love" (Bidstrup, Callaghan) - 3:05
 "To The North" (Bidstrup, Callaghan) - 2:46
 "House of Cards" - 2:45

Tracks from this album were also featured in the surf film Mad Wax.

Charts

Certification

Releases

References

Gang Gajang albums
1985 debut albums
Albums produced by Joe Wissert